Mohamed Cherkaoui (5 March 1921 – 31 December 2022) was a Moroccan politician and diplomat. Cherkaoui was a signatory of the Proclamation of Independence of Morocco of 1944. He held several ministerial positions in the Moroccan government, including Minister of Economic Affairs and Finance from 1964 to 1965, as well as Ambassador to France from 1961 to 1964. 

Cherkaoui was married to Princess Lalla Malika of Morocco, sister of late King Hassan II of Morocco, with whom he had four children.

Biography
Cherkaoui was born in Bejaad in the French protectorate of Morocco on 5 March 1921. He completed secondary school in Casablanca and obtained his law degree from the University of Bordeaux in France. He also received a diploma in geography and history from Hautes Études de Rabat. He was the director of the La Voix nationale newspaper from 1943 to 1944.

Cherkaoui was appointed Minister of State from 1955 to 1956. During this time, Cherkaoui, Abderrahim Bouabid, Driss M'hammedi and Ahmed Réda Guédira led the Moroccan delegation which negotiated the kingdom's independence from France and Spain. Cherkaoui later served as Morocco's Ambassador to France from 1961 to 1964.
  
Mohamed Cherkaoui died in Rabat, Morocco on 31 December 2022, at the age of 101.

References

1921 births
2022 deaths
People from Béni Mellal-Khénifra
Ambassadors of Morocco to France
Finance ministers of Morocco
Government ministers of Morocco
University of Bordeaux alumni
Men centenarians
Moroccan centenarians